Events in the year 1793 in India.

Incumbents
 Marquess Cornwallis, Governor-General, 1786–93.
 John Shore, 1st Baron Teignmouth, Governor-General, 1793–96.

Events
 Capture of Pondicherry.

References

 
India
Years of the 18th century in India